Nyankpala is a town in the Tolon-Kumbungu District, about 10 miles south-west of Tamale, the capital of the Northern Region in north Ghana. The University for Development Studies (UDS) has a campus located in Nyankpala. This campus is the first of the university's four campuses, the first to be established in northern Ghana. Nyankpala is the hub for some important Government Institutions including the headquarters of Savanna Agricultural Research Institute (SARI) of the Council for Scientific and Industrial Research (CSIR), an on-farm station of the Animal Research Institute (ARI), onfarm station of the Soil Research Institute. The Avnash rice industry has a plant located in the town. This research institutes has been visited occasionally by students and academics who are on educational tour.

Nyankpala is a home to some public Junior High Schools. The first that was established is the Nyankpala District Assembly (D/A) Junior High School. Others Include: Nizamia English and Arabic (E/A) Junior High School, St. Monicas Roman Catholic (R/C) Junior High School, Islamia E/A Junior High School, the Nyankpala Model School and numerous Primary Schools and Kindergartens.

Nyankpala has market days running every 6 days. During market days, traders, students, farmers and government workers troop to the market to purchase groceries and other items.

Nyankpala is known across Dagbon as the hub for mango, rice farms and rice products. This apparently attracted Avnash rice Industries to set its mega plant in the community.

Tourist Attractions in Nyankpala
 Beyom Palace
 University for Development Studies
 Savanna Agricultural Research Institute
 Animal Research Institute
 Nakoha Tii Gbuni
 Avnash Rice Industry

Influential People in Nyankpala

The Nyankpala Chief Lawson Abduali Yakubu and HRH Queen Amina Sabrina Yakubu.

Uztaz Hassan Mohammed (Founder of Nizamia E/A Schools)

The Chief Imam

Past Prominent Chiefs of Nyankpala
 Naa Kaleem Kpema (He built the current Beyom Palace)
 Naa Damba
 Naa J. S. Kaleem 
 Naa Abdulai Yakubu

The paramount chief of Nyankpala is installed by the Ya-Na, the King of the Dagbon Kingdom. The chiefdom also has several villages and towns including Kpalisogu, Kpana, Gawagu, Daasuyili, Tingoli, Nafarin, Tuunaayili, Gbulahagu, Gbinjari, Adubiliyili, Kukuonaayili, and Golinga, under its jurisdiction and which it installs.

References

2. Savanna Agricultural Research Institute

3. University for Development Studies

Populated places in the Northern Region (Ghana)